Hatifa is an East German film. It was released in 1960.

External links
 

1960 films
East German films
1960s German-language films
Films set in the 7th century BC
Films about slavery
German children's films
Films based on German novels
Films based on children's books
Films based on historical novels
Films_based_on_fairy_tales
1960s German films